Mercer County Schools may refer to:
 Mercer County Schools (Kentucky)
 Mercer County Schools (West Virginia)